Dortheys Hiyo Eluay International Airport, also known as Sentani International Airport  is an airport serving Jayapura, the capital of Papua province, Indonesia, on the island of New Guinea. It is located in the Sentani District, approximately 40 km from downtown Jayapura; the name 'Sentani' is taken from Lake
Sentani nearby. It is the easternmost airport in Indonesia, the main hub, and the largest airport on the island of New Guinea. On 14 October 2019, the management of the airport was taken over by PT Angkasa Pura I (Persero).

History
Sentani Airport was a part of the large American facilities at Hollandia (now Jayapura), which was seized from the Japanese during World War II by an American amphibious task force Code named Operation Reckless on 22 April 1944.

The area was occupied by the Japanese in April 1942, and by 10 October 1943, the Japanese had built a large complex with two runways: a western runway of 4,500 ft and a second southern runway was 6,200 ft x 340 ft. There were 24 larger bomber revetments to the west of the strip, and an additional 27 to the east of the field, connected by taxiways to the two runways. Anti-aircraft defenses included 4 light guns that were later upgraded. The airfields were badly cratered by American bomber raids.

Once controlled by the Americans, the airfields were rebuilt, and it became a command and control base with large numbers of operational units flying combat missions with fighters and heavy bombers operating out of the area. The American facilities consisted of three large military airfields: Hollandia, Sentani and Cyclops Airfields.

At the end of the war, Hollandia Airfield was abandoned, and until the early 2010s, it was reclaimed by natural overgrowth. The latest aerial imagery of this area now shows a large housing development project underway on the site. Cyclops Airfield, which was a single runway facility to the northeast of Sentani Airfield and originally built by the Japanese, was also abandoned and is now part of the town of Sentani. This field is notable because it functioned as MacArthur's HQ at Hollandia.

Sentani Airfield is the only part of the complex still in use as an airfield today.  It is used as the principal entry point into the Indonesian half of the island of Papua.

Major USAAF units stationed at Hollandia
 308th Bombardment Wing	(10 August-22 October 1944)
 310th Bombardment Wing				(6 May-18 September 1944)
 85th Fighter Wing		        	(24 July-24 October 1944)
 3d Bombardment Group		        		(12 May-16 November 1944)
 312th Bombardment Group		(June-19 November 1944)
 49th Fighter Group   				(17 May-5 June 1944)
 475th Fighter Group 		        	(15 May-14 July 1944)
 317th Troop Carrier Group			(June-17 November 1944)
 418th Night Fighter Squadron	        			(12 May-28 September 1944)

Name change 
On 20 October 2020, Governor of Papua Lukas Enembe proposed to officially change the name of Sentani International Airport to Dortheys Hiyo Eluay International Airport. Enembe stated that the name, which stands for Papuan late former legislative member and activist Theys Hiyo Eluay, was a form of respect for "one of the charismatic Papuan figures" and a public figure of Sentani tribe, whose people is the owner of customary land rights of the airport. Furthermore, Regent of Jayapura Mathius Awoitauw says that he was the axis of change for all indigenous peoples in Papua, so that so he hoped the public "would not have to argue anymore" and "have the same perception". However, Tribal Council of Sentani (Dewan Adat Suku Sentani) rejects the name change, citing lack of consultation with Sentani people who owned the land. Regional regulation on the name was passed by the legislative body of Jayapura Regency and was approved later by Ministry of Transportation. Although, as of now, the official name of the airport is still Sentani International Airport.

Facilities
Sentani Airport has three airbridges.

Airlines and destinations

Passenger

Cargo

The airport serves as the main port of entry to the island of Indonesian New Guinea. The air traffic is roughly divided between flights connecting to destinations within the Papua province and flights linking Papua to other parts of Indonesia.

Sentani Airport is also the main base for several aviation organizations, including Associated Mission Aviation, Mission Aviation Fellowship, YAJASI and Tariku Aviation.

Statistics

Airport facility improvements
In October 2012, The Ministry of Transportation announced plans to extend the length of the airport's runway to 3,000 meters, add a parallel taxiway, and to expand the passenger terminal to accommodate jet bridges to board and disembark passengers. As of the end of 2015, the airport incorporates all the aforementioned improvements.

Culture hygiene
Unlike typical airport terminals around the world, Sentani Airport features signs that read "Dilarang makan pinang" (translated, "Consumption of betel nuts is prohibited") posted on walls throughout the terminal. A sight that often attracts the attention of foreign travelers, these were posted in the late 2000s as the airport management's response to the local population's tendencies to chew areca nuts then dispose of red residue (caused by chewing) by spitting on public ground, leaving an unsightly stain on the ground.

Gallery

See also

 USAF in the Southwest Pacific

References

External links

 
 

Airports in Papua (province)
Airfields of the United States Army Air Forces in the South West Pacific theatre of World War II
Jayapura
Airfields of the United States Army Air Forces Air Transport Command in the South West Pacific Theater
World War II sites in Indonesia
Transport in Papua (province)